Dolly Sinatra (born Natalina Maria Vittoria Garaventa; ; December 26, 1897 – January 6, 1977) was the mother of American singer Frank Sinatra. She was born in Lumarzo (Province of Genoa), in northern Italy; she immigrated to the United States as an infant.

Dolly married Antonino Martino "Marty" Sinatra in 1913, and in 1915 the couple's only child, Frank Sinatra, was born. Dolly was influential in the Sinatras' neighborhood in Hoboken, New Jersey, where they later operated a tavern during Prohibition. She became involved in politics and worked as a midwife. It is believed that she also provided an illegal abortion service in the area. She died in a plane crash in 1977.

Early life
Natalina Maria Vittoria Garaventa was born on December 26, 1897 in Lumarzo, Genoa, in northern Italy. She was brought to the United States when she was two months old. When she was a child, her pretty face earned her the nickname "Dolly". As an adult, she stood less than five feet tall and weighed approximately 90 pounds. Biographer James Kaplan describes her as having a "politician's temperament—restless, energetic, unreflective". Her father was a lithographer. He was also a peasant.

Marriage and labor difficulties

During her teen years, Dolly met Antonino Martino "Marty" Sinatra, born in Lercara Friddi, who immigrated from Catania, Sicily. Though her family opposed it, the couple eloped on Valentine's Day 1913, and were married at the city hall in Jersey City, New Jersey; they were later remarried in a church.

Dolly gave birth to Francis Albert Sinatra on December 12, 1915, in an upstairs tenement at 415 Monroe Street in Hoboken, New Jersey, the couple's only child. A childhood operation on his mastoid bone left major scarring on his neck, and during adolescence he suffered from cystic acne that scarred his face and neck. The family was Roman Catholic, but due to her son's injuries at birth, his baptism was delayed for several months.

Politics
Dolly was influential in Hoboken and in local Democratic Party circles. She used her knowledge of Italian dialects and fluent English to translate for immigrants during court proceedings, particularly those pertaining to requests for citizenship. This earned her the respect of local politicians, who made her a Democratic ward leader. She was the first immigrant woman to hold that position in her local third ward, where she reliably delivered as many as six hundred votes for Democratic candidates. In 1919, she chained herself to city hall in support of the Women's suffrage movement. She also worked as a midwife, earning $50 for each delivery, a fair amount of money at the time. These activities kept Dolly away from home during much of her son's childhood. According to Kaplan, Dolly also ran an illegal abortion service that earned her the nickname "Hatpin Dolly". Her reputation as an abortion care provider led one area church to ban her son from singing there.

Tavern
In 1920, Prohibition of alcohol became law in the U.S. Dolly and Marty ran a tavern during those years, allowed to operate openly by local officials who refused to enforce the law. Kaplan notes the possibility that the Sinatras procured their liquor from members of the American Mafia. They purchased the bar, which they named Marty O'Brien's, with money they borrowed from Dolly's parents. Sinatra later recalled spending time at the bar, working on his homework and occasionally singing a song on top of the player piano for spare change. According to Kaplan, Dolly doted on her son, but she also abused him when he angered her, hitting him with a small bat she kept at Marty O'Brien's.

Personal life
Dolly enjoyed gambling while visiting her son in Las Vegas. As she didn't like to lose they would often rig one of the slot machines so that she kept winning.

Death
On January 6, 1977, Dolly Sinatra had invited friend Mrs. Anthony Carboni to join her in a private flight, provided by son Frank Sinatra, to come to Vegas for a show and gambling, but shortly after take-off from Palm Springs Municipal Airport, the Gates Learjet 24 crashed into a 10,000-foot (3,048-meter) snowy mountaintop ridge, in the eastern portion of the San Gorgonio Wilderness, killing all aboard. Dolly Sinatra was 79 years old. It was later concluded the crash was due to crew error that killed the four people aboard. Also killed were pilots Donald J. Weier, 36, and Jerold W. Foley, 33, both of Las Vegas, Nevada. Because of darkness, freezing temperatures, and rugged terrain at the crash site, it took days for authorities to recover all the bodies. Dolly Sinatra was later interred at Desert Memorial Park in nearby Cathedral City, California, where her husband, Marty Sinatra, was buried nearly a decade earlier.

In popular culture
Dolly Sinatra was portrayed by Academy Award winning actress Olympia Dukakis in the 1992 biographical miniseries Sinatra.

References

Bibliography

 

1897 births
American people of Italian descent
1977 deaths
Accidental deaths in California
American socialites
American midwives
American democracy activists
Burials at Desert Memorial Park
Italian emigrants to the United States
20th-century American women
20th-century American people
Victims of aviation accidents or incidents in 1977
Victims of aviation accidents or incidents in the United States